Adult/Child (sometimes typeset as Adult Child) is an unreleased studio album by the American rock band the Beach Boys that was produced in early 1977. Similar to their previous effort, The Beach Boys Love You, the album was essentially a solo effort by the band's chief songwriter and producer, Brian Wilson. It consists of seven new songs, four of which feature orchestral arrangements by Dick Reynolds, along with five older tracks that had been unreleased by the band. Lyric topics range from healthy diets and exercise to shaving a tomboy's legs and waiting at a movie theater queue. Some of the tracks, including "It's Over Now" and "Still I Dream of It", were originally written to be recorded by a singer such as Frank Sinatra.

Although it was scheduled to be issued in September 1977, the release was vetoed by Wilson's bandmates Mike Love and Al Jardine, who felt that the record was too strange to sell. Instead, the group delivered M.I.U. Album, which included only one song in common with Adult/Child, "Hey Little Tomboy", albeit in a rerecorded form. A few Adult/Child tracks were later released on the 1993 box set Good Vibrations: Thirty Years of the Beach Boys. The full album remains unreleased, but circulates widely on bootlegs and unauthorized YouTube uploads.

Background
At the end of 1976, Brian Wilson produced The Beach Boys Love You (released in April 1977), after which he immediately moved onto the production of what became Adult/Child. Music historian Keith Badman writes that Wilson "reportedly [started the new album] on the insistence of his former doctor", Eugene Landy, who had been relieved of his services in December 1976. Wilson's 2016 memoir, I Am Brian Wilson, attributes the album's title to Landy. "He meant that there were always two parts of a personality, always an adult who wants to be in charge and a child who wants to be cared for, always an adult who thinks he knows the rules and a child who is learning and testing the rules."

Adult/Child would have been their final record on Reprise, a subsidiary of Warner Bros. Records Early in the year, band manager Stephen Love had arranged negotiations for the band to move to CBS Records once obligations to Warner had been fulfilled. Issues related to the band's recording contracts and other areas of their management plagued the group for the remainder of the year.

Style and production

Adult/Child was largely recorded from February 9 to June 3, 1977 at the band's Brother Studios in Santa Monica. The songs mostly feature Brian with his brothers Dennis and Carl; contributions from Al Jardine and Mike Love were limited to recordings from earlier sessions. Dennis recorded his solo album Pacific Ocean Blue in between Adult/Child sessions at the same studio. Love and Jardine were sequestered in Switzerland and Big Sur, respectively, and so they were rarely present for the recording. Earle Mankey, who had engineered 15 Big Ones and Love You, returned for Adult/Child.

Five of the 12 tracks that were to be included on Adult/Child had dated from earlier recording sessions or had been rejected from prior Beach Boys albums. "Games Two Can Play" and "H.E.L.P. Is On the Way" were outtakes from Sunflower (1970) and Surf's Up (1971), respectively.  "Shortenin' Bread" is a traditional folk song that Brian recorded throughout the early to mid-1970s and features vocals from American Spring.  "Hey Little Tomboy" and "On Broadway" were outtakes from 15 Big Ones (1976). The former had also been passed over for Love You.

Wilson commissioned Four Freshmen arranger Dick Reynolds, whom he had previously worked with on the Beach Boys' 1964 Christmas album, to compose orchestrations for four tracks: "Life is for the Living", "It's Over Now", "Still I Dream of It", and "Deep Purple". According to Stan Love, when his brother Mike heard them, Mike turned to Brian and asked: "What the fuck are you doing?" Brian remembered, "He told me I was fucking around, that I wasn't serious. [...] I cut a track with swing music [...] and he got mad. He said 'What are you doing messing around for?' I said I'm just trying to do what I like, what I think is for now's times.""

Musically, Adult/Child is keyboard-heavy, with Brian's cigarette-damaged voice providing most of the lead vocals. Lyrically, the subject matter ranges from healthy diets and exercise to ecology. Mankey said, "[Brian]'s looking for a goal. Some of the new songs reflect his everyday situation, like 'Help Is On The Way' ." Music critic Matthew Weiner referred to it as "Brian's Sinatra album", or "Brian's 'Food Album'", wherein "one song finds the recluse staring into the mirror at his blubbery naked body – in another, he yearns to drown his sorrows in a good meal, with the whole aesthetic basically encapsulated in a fantastically Moog-y rendition of the children's song, 'Shortenin' Bread'". 

The opening track, "Life Is for the Living", begins with the lines "Life is for the living / Don't sit around on your ass smoking grass / That stuff went out a long time ago". Frank Sinatra is directly referenced in the lyrics of "It's Over Now", a song that, alongside "Still I Dream of It", was reportedly intended to be recorded by a singer such as Sinatra.

Adult/Child was mixed and assembled on June 27, 1977, just days after the cancellation of a planned European summer tour by the group, which would have saw them performing songs from Adult/Child. Other tracks that the band recorded during these sessions was "New England Waltz" and a cover of the Spencer Davis Group's 1966 hit "Gimme Some Lovin'".

Cancellation

Adult/Child was widely publicized as the Beach Boys' next release and planned for issue in September 1977. Dennis told a reporter, "[It is the] strangest album I've ever heard. [Brian]'s vocals are the best I've ever heard him. I'm elated with the new album, it's really gonna be a surprise. I don't know where it's coming from, but it's positive, again." Asked if the album was a "contract pay-off", Carl responded, "Naah, Brian's writing great songs, more grandiose than Love You with more players."

Badman speculated that the album may have been shelved because the group wanted to save the material for a later album, or because the release was vetoed by Warner–Reprise or Wilson's bandmates. Brian's 2016 memoir supports that his bandmates and Warner Bros. did not feel confident about the album. However, according to Dave Berson, an executive at Warner Bros., the band's record contract did not include a proviso stating that Warner could reject albums.

Biographer Peter Ames Carlin, who is more certain in his explanation for the album's non-release, says that, following the commercial failure of Love You, Wilson's bandmates—particularly Mike Love and Al Jardine—"told Brian that his new songs were too weird, too out there, to appeal to the mass market [...] From now on they would record and release music that fans wanted to hear—and because they were the ones up in the front lines onstage every night, they would be the ones to judge what would appeal."

Availability
Some of the unreleased songs on Adult/Child later saw individual release on subsequent Beach Boys albums and compilations.
 A rerecorded version of "Hey Little Tomboy" appeared on M.I.U. Album (1978).
 A rerecorded version of "Shortenin' Bread" appeared on L.A. (Light Album) (1979).
 The original Adult/Child mixes of "H.E.L.P. Is On the Way", "Games Two Can Play", "It's Over Now", and "Still I Dream of It" were included on the 1993 box set Good Vibrations: Thirty Years of the Beach Boys.
 A piano demo of "Still I Dream of It" was included on Wilson's 1995 album I Just Wasn't Made for These Times.

The album itself circulates widely on bootlegs and unauthorized YouTube uploads. "Life Is for the Living", "Deep Purple", "On Broadway", "It's Trying to Say", "Everybody Wants to Live", "Lines", and the original versions of "Hey Little Tomboy" and "Shortenin' Bread" remain officially unreleased.

Critical reception

In his 1978 biography, The Beach Boys and the California Myth, David Leaf was generally unfavorable toward Love You and Adult/Child, although he enjoyed "It's Over Now" and "Still I Dream of It", naming them "the most personal tunes Brian has recorded since ''Til I Die.'" Musicologist Philip Lambert wrote, "All of the songs from this collection are solid efforts, but 'Still I Dream of It' and 'It's Over Now' are particularly inspired and rank right up there with Brian's best work." Carlin referred to "Hey Little Tomboy" as "the worst" of the Adult/Child songs, and "the most unsettling" of the Beach Boys' recording history. 

Billboard contributor Morgan Enos felt, "A couple of the tunes stand up to any ballad on Pet Sounds, and others, like 'Hey! Little Tomboy's  creepy leering at a girl who throws out her skateboard and 'shaves her legs,' mostly reflect Wilson's declining mental state." Music critic Robert Dayton decreed Adult/Child to be one of the best of the Beach Boys' 1970s albums. Dayton wrote, 

In his 2008 book The Rough Guide to the Best Music You've Never Heard, Nigel Williamson praised Adult/Child for its "quirky charm and goofy unpredictability". Stylus Magazine included the album in a list entitled "'Long Time Gone' – The Classic Rock Lost Album Archetypes" among other unreleased Beach Boys work such as Smile, Landlocked, and Bambu as "A Lost Album Category Unto Themselves". Contributor Matthew Weiner wrote:

Track listing

Notes
 Lead vocals sourced from Badman.
 Some bootlegs include bonus tracks that were recorded by the group between the 1960s and 1980s.

See also
 The Beach Boys bootleg recordings
 Sweet Insanity

Notes

References

Bibliography

External links
 
 

The Beach Boys bootleg recordings
Albums produced by Brian Wilson
Unreleased albums
Big band albums
1977 albums
Outsider music albums